Yelena Silina (born 20 June 1987) is a Russian ice hockey player for SKIF Nizhny Novgorod and the Russian national team. She participated at the 2015 and 2016 IIHF Women's World Championships.

References

1987 births
Living people
Russian women's ice hockey forwards
Ice hockey people from Moscow
Universiade medalists in ice hockey
Universiade gold medalists for Russia
Universiade silver medalists for Russia
Competitors at the 2013 Winter Universiade
Competitors at the 2015 Winter Universiade